Nazlet Zeid (also known as Nazlat ash-Sheikh Zeid) is a Palestinian village in the northern West Bank, administratively part of the Jenin Governorate. The village is in Area C, putting it under full Israeli military and civilian control. The West Bank barrier runs through the village. According to the Palestinian Central Bureau of Statistics, the village had a population of 704 in the 2007 census.

History

Ottoman era
In the late Ottoman era, it was noted as a place named Sheik Zeid, which was presumed to come from a personal name.

British Mandate era
In the 1922 census of Palestine conducted by the British Mandate authorities, Kh. al-Sheikh Zaid had a population 10,  all  Muslims.

The inhabitants are mostly belong to the Al-Kilani family. The village was named after Sheikh Zeid Kilani, the late leader of the Kilani family. The village was the site of a 1935 shootout between the Arab resistance leader Izz al-Din al-Qassam and British Mandatory police, which ended with al-Qassam killed.

In the 1945 statistics the population of  Nazlet Zeid was counted with that of Ya'bad,  in an official land and population survey.

Jordanian era
In the wake of the 1948 Arab–Israeli War, and after the 1949 Armistice Agreements, Nazlet Zeid  came under Jordanian rule.

In 1961, the population of Nazlat Zeid was  132 persons.

post-1967
Since the Six-Day War in 1967, Nazlet Zeid has been under Israeli occupation. The population of Nazlat Zeid in the 1967 census conducted by  Israel was 271, of whom 27  originated from the Israeli territory.

References

Bibliography

External links
Welcome To Kh. Nazlet Zeid
Survey of Western Palestine, Map 8: IAA, Wikimedia commons

Villages in the West Bank
Jenin Governorate
Municipalities of the State of Palestine